Baku 1980 was an international chess tournament held from March 29 to April 18 in 1980. The participants were Garry Kasparov (2595), Alexander Beliavsky (2590), Eugenio Torre (2520), Istvan Csom (2510), Eduard Gufeld (2510), Lothar Vogt (2510), Adrian Mikhalchishin (2490), Igor Zaitsev (2490), Vladimir Antoshin (2480), Karen Grigorian (2475), Slobodan Martinovic (2475), Silvino García Martínez (2450), Jiří Lechtýnský (2450), Elmar Magerramov (2435), Nikola Padevsky (2415), and Maia Chiburdanidze (2400).

Table

Source 
 Шахматный бюллетень, 1980 №7, С. 215—218

References 

Sports competitions in Baku
Chess competitions